Robert Felix Torti (born October 22, 1961) is an American actor.

Torti originated the roles of Jesus and Jack in both the New York City and Los Angeles stage productions of Reefer Madness.

Earlier in his career, Torti was honored with a Tony Award nomination for his performance as Greaseball in Starlight Express, which marked his Broadway debut. His work on Broadway also includes the role of Pharaoh in the musical Joseph and the Amazing Technicolor Dreamcoat a role which he reprised in the 1999 film adaptation. In addition, he appeared in the London and Los Angeles productions of Smokey Joe's Café.

On screen, Torti played singer Freddy Fredrickson in Tom Hanks's That Thing You Do!. He also reprised the role of Pharaoh in the film version of Joseph and the Amazing Technicolor Dreamcoat, and counts among his other film credits Who's Your Daddy, Submerged, and The Legend of William Tell (currently unreleased).

Torti has also been seen on television in regular and recurring roles on such series as The Drew Carey Show, Vinnie & Bobby, Generations, The Young and the Restless, and The Suite Life of Zack & Cody, where he plays Kurt Martin the father of the title boys, and the sequel The Suite Life on Deck. In addition, he has made guest appearances on numerous series.

In August 2020, Torti was featured on the soundtrack Broadway Sings Blood Rock: The Musical with Andy Mientus, Damon Daunno, and Jennifer DiNoia.

Personal life

Torti was born in Van Nuys, California. He married DeLee Lively on June 24, 1999. Together, they have four children: daughter Ashlee Torti (born 1989), son Zachary Torti (born 1992), daughter Faith Torti (born 1996) and daughter Chloe Torti (born 2001).

Filmography
Quincy, M.E. (1980) (Lance Sullivan)
Little House on the Prairie (1981) (Stefano Gambini)
Alley Cat (1984) (Johnny)
Throb (1987) (Fabian)
P.I. Private Investigations (1987) (Burglar)
Family Ties (1989) (Jack)
Father Dowling Mysteries (1989) (Sean)
One of the Boys (1989) (Jack)
Generations (1989) (Lt. Kyle Masters)
Quantum Leap (1989) (Jimmy Giovani)
Out of This World (1990) (Flash)
Top of the Heap (1991) (Bobby Grazzo)
She Wolf of London (1991) (Larabee Link)
Murder, She Wrote (1992) (Damian Bolo)
Vinnie & Bobby (1992) (Bobby Grazzo)
The Fresh Prince of Bel-Air (1992) (Frank)
Days of Our Lives (1993) (Charlie Van Dieter)
Hangin' with Mr. Cooper (1993)
Melrose Place (1995) (Jim Stone)
The Drew Carey Show (1995–2001) (Jay Clemens / Nick)
That Thing You Do! (1996) (Freddy Fredrickson)
The Guardian (1997) (Pintor)
Honey, I Shrunk the Kids: The TV Show (1997)
Beverly Hills, 90210 (1997) (Everett Sands)
Clueless (1998) (Joe Pizzulo)
Joseph and the Amazing Technicolor Dreamcoat (1999) (Pharaoh)
Good vs. Evil (2000) (Joey Dimarcola)
Cover Me (2000) (Mr. Zito)
Submerged (2000) (Dr. Frank Ewing)
Any Day Now (2001) (Stage Manager)
Spyder Games (2001) (Jimmy)
Sabrina, the Teenage Witch (2001) (Even Steven)
V.I.P. (2001) (Jeremy Harmetz)
Hey Arnold! (2002) (Voices)
Do Over (2002) (Bobby Kindler)
The Young and the Restless (2003–2004) (Salvatore Staley)
Quintuplets (2004) (Jake)
Reefer Madness: The Movie Musical (2005) (Jesus)
The Suite Life of Zack & Cody (2005–2008) (Kurt Martin, 5 episodes)
Numb3rs (2005) (Arthur Rimbelli)
She's the Man (2006) (Coach Pistonek)
Players' Club (2006) (video short)
The Game Plan (2007) (Samuel Blake)
Half Past Dead 2 (2007) (Assistant Warden)
Monk
Lovely Evening (2009) (Lucy)
Race to Witch Mountain (2009) (Jack's Boss Dominick)
The Suite Life on Deck (2009-2011) (Kurt Martin)
Criminal Minds (2017) (Sheriff Scott Paseo)

Theater
Little Fish as RobertJesus Christ Superstar (as Judas)Godspell (as Jesus)West Side Story (as Bernardo)Grease (as Danny)To Sir with Love (as Santo)Starlight Express (as Greaseball)Joseph and the Amazing Technicolour Dreamcoat (as Pharaoh)Smokey Joe's Café (as Bob)The Gift (as Don)Sneaux (as Larry, Bob)Reefer Madness (as Jesus, Jack)Rock of Ages (as Hertz)

Awards and nominations
He was nominated for Broadway's 1987 Tony Award as Best Actor (Featured Role – Musical) for "Starlight Express."
He won a Drama-logue award for his performance as Jesus in Godspell.
He won an Ovation Award for his performance as the characters Jesus and Jack in Reefer Madness (musical)''.

References

External links

1961 births
20th-century American male actors
21st-century American male actors
American male film actors
American male musical theatre actors
American male soap opera actors
American male stage actors
American male television actors
American people of Italian descent
Living people
Male actors from Los Angeles
People from Van Nuys, Los Angeles